Mohammed Marzooq Abdulaa Mohd Al-Matroushi (Arabic:محمد مرزوق) (born 23 January 1989) is an Emirati footballer. He currently plays as a defender for Shabab Al-Ahli.

References

External links
 

Emirati footballers
1989 births
Living people
Al Jazira Club players
Al Shabab Al Arabi Club Dubai players
Shabab Al-Ahli Club players
United Arab Emirates international footballers
UAE Pro League players
Association football defenders